Marion Wilmes (born 24 June 1982) is a German former footballer who played as a midfielder. She made two appearances for the Germany national team in 2002.

References

External links
 

1982 births
Living people
German women's footballers
Women's association football midfielders
Germany women's international footballers
Place of birth missing (living people)